John Jestyn Llewellin, 1st Baron Llewellin  (6 February 1893 – 24 January 1957) was a British army officer, Conservative Party politician and minister in Winston Churchill's war government.

Background
Llewellin was the son of William Llewellin, of Upton House, Dorset, and Frances Mary, daughter of L. D. Wigan. He was educated at Eton.

Military career
Llewellin was commissioned into the Royal Garrison Artillery in 1914 and reached the rank of Major during the First World War, winning the Military Cross in 1917. He remained in the Territorial Army after the war and was promoted to Lieutenant-Colonel commanding the Dorset Heavy Brigade in 1932. He was promoted Colonel in 1936 and retired in 1938. He was appointed an Officer of the Order of the British Empire (OBE) in 1926, promoted to a Commander (CBE) in 1939, and then was made a Knight Grand Cross (GBE) in 1953.

Political career
Llewellin was elected Member of Parliament (MP) for Uxbridge in Middlesex in 1929. He held a number of ministerial posts in the Coalition government, eventually serving as President of the Board of Trade for two weeks in 1942. He subsequently became Minister of Aircraft Production until replaced by Sir Stafford Cripps in November 1942. Later, Llewellin served on the Combined Policy Committee set up by the British and United States governments under the Quebec Agreement of 1943 to oversee the construction of the atomic bomb.

In December 1943 Llewellin's seat on the committee was assumed by Sir Ronald Campbell and Llewellin became Minister of Food, the position he held until the Churchill government fell to the Labour Party of Clement Attlee in July 1945. Llewellin lost his seat in the election and was raised to the peerage as Baron Llewellin, of Upton in the County of Dorset. After the war he served as Governor General of the Federation of Rhodesia and Nyasaland between 1953 and his death in January 1957.

Personal life
Lord Lewellin died in January 1957, aged 63. The barony became extinct with his death.

Arms

References

Bibliography

External links 

 

1893 births
1957 deaths
Admiralty personnel of World War II
British Army personnel of World War I
British Secretaries of State
British people of World War II
Conservative Party (UK) MPs for English constituencies
Conservative Party (UK) hereditary peers
Governors-General of the Federation of Rhodesia and Nyasaland
Knights Grand Cross of the Order of the British Empire
Llewellin, John Llewellin, 1st Baron
Members of the Privy Council of the United Kingdom
Ministers in the Chamberlain peacetime government, 1937–1939
Ministers in the Chamberlain wartime government, 1939–1940
Ministers in the Churchill caretaker government, 1945
Ministers in the Churchill wartime government, 1940–1945
Barons created by George VI
People educated at Eton College
Presidents of the Board of Trade
Recipients of the Military Cross
Royal Garrison Artillery officers
UK MPs 1929–1931
UK MPs 1931–1935
UK MPs 1935–1945
UK MPs who were granted peerages